Movement disorder refers to any clinical syndrome with either an excess of movement or a paucity of voluntary and involuntary movements, unrelated to weakness or spasticity.  Movement disorders are synonymous with basal ganglia or extrapyramidal diseases.  Movement disorders are conventionally divided into two major categories- hyperkinetic and hypokinetic.

Hyperkinetic movement disorders refer to dyskinesia, or excessive, often repetitive, involuntary movements that intrude upon the normal flow of motor activity.

Hypokinetic movement disorders refer to akinesia (lack of movement), hypokinesia (reduced amplitude of movements), bradykinesia (slow movement), and rigidity. In primary movement disorders, the abnormal movement is the primary manifestation of the disorder. In secondary movement disorders, the abnormal movement is a manifestation of another systemic or neurological disorder.

Classification

Diagnosis 
Step I : Decide the dominant type of movement disorder

Step II :  Make differential diagnosis of the particular disorder

Step II:  Confirm the diagnosis by lab tests
 Metabolic screening
 Microbiology
 Immunology
 CSF examination
 Genetics
 Imaging
 Neurophysiological tests
 Pharmacological tests

Treatment

Treatment depends upon the underlying disorder. Movement disorders have been known to be associated with a variety of autoimmune diseases.

History 
Vesalius and Piccolomini in 16th century distinguished subcortical nuclei from cortex and white matter. However Willis' conceptualized the corpus striatum as the seat of motor power in the late 17th century. In mid-19th-century movement disorders were localized to striatum by Choreaby Broadbent and Jackson, and athetosis by Hammond. By the late 19th century, many movement disorders were described but for most no pathologic correlate was known.

References

External links 

Neurological disorders
Extrapyramidal and movement disorders
Symptoms and signs: Nervous and musculoskeletal systems